Robert Snelling was one of the two MPs for Ipswich in a number of English parliaments between 1614 and 1626.

References

Snelling